Chapai Nawabganj-3 is a constituency represented in the Jatiya Sangsad (National Parliament) of Bangladesh since 2019 by Harunur Rashid of the Bangladesh Nationalist Party.

Boundaries 
The constituency encompasses Chapai Nawabganj Sadar Upazila.

History 
The constituency was created in 1984 from the Rajshahi-3 constituency when the former Rajshahi District was split into four districts: Nawabganj, Naogaon, Rajshahi, and Natore.

Members of Parliament 
Key

Elections

Elections in the 2010s

General Election 2018

Abdul Odud was re-elected unopposed in the 2014 general election after opposition parties withdrew their candidacies in a boycott of the election.

Elections in the 2000s

Elections in the 1990s

References

External links
 

Parliamentary constituencies in Bangladesh
Chapai Nawabganj District